Selva Almada (born 5 April 1973) is an Argentine writer of poetry, short stories, and novels. She expanded into nonfiction in 2014 with the book Chicas muertas.

Career
Selva Almada studied Social Communication in Paraná, although she left this program to enter the Professorship of Literature at Paraná's Institute of Higher Education. She began giving shape to her first works, some of which were developed from the workshop that Maria Elena Lotringer offered at the School of Communication.

Her first stories were published in the Paraná weekly Análisis. From 1997 to 1998 she directed a brief self-managed cultural literary project called CAelum Blue.

Her apprenticeship as a storyteller was largely established in Buenos Aires in the creative space of Alberto Laiseca's literary workshop. Her authority as a writer has been publicly confirmed by literary figures such as Chilean writer Diego Zúñiga and the journalist, writer, and essayist Beatriz Sarlo. Her stories have been included in various anthologies from by the publishers Norma, Mondadori, and Ediciones del Dock, among others.

She gives various literary workshops. From March to July 2017, she directed the Taller de relato autobiográfico Mirarse el ombligo (Navel Gazing Autobiographical Story Workshop) at Escuela Entrepalabras.

Trilogía de varones
Her literary output gained prestige and praise from critics in 2012 with the publication of her first novel, El viento que arrasa. Claríns magazine  highlighted it as "the novel of the year". It has since been reissued several times, was published abroad, and translated into French, Portuguese, Dutch, and German. First published in English as The Wind that Lays Waste (translated by Chris Andrews), the novel would become the first in the so-called "trilogy of men", followed in 2013 by Ladrilleros (translated as Brickmakers by Annie McDermott in 2021) and No es un río in 2021.

In 2021, it was reported El viento que arrasa was in the works to be adapted into a film, directed by Paula Hernández and co-produced by Argentine studios Rizoma and Tarea Fina, and Uruguayan studio Cimarrón.

Chicas Muertas
With her nonfiction chronicle Chicas muertas, Almada brought to light three femicides that occurred in different Argentine provinces in the 1980s, making herself known as a feminist writer.

Personal life
Selva Almada was born in Villa Elisa, Entre Ríos and lived there until she was 17. In 1991 she moved to Paraná to study, first Social Communication, then Literature, and lived in that city until 1999. Since 2000 she has lived in Buenos Aires.

She made frequent trips to Chaco Province which, along with her rural experience of childhood and youth spent in the Argentine Littoral, gave rise to several of the environments and themes of her books.

Works
2003: Mal de muñecas. Editorial Carne Argentina. Poetry. .
2005: Niños. Editorial de la Universidad de La Plata. Novella. .
2007: Una chica de provincia. Editorial Gárgola. Short stories. .
2012: El viento que arrasa. Mardulce Editora. Novel. .
2012: Intemec. Editorial Los Proyectos. Short stories. . (e-book)
2013: Ladrilleros. Mardulce Editora. Novel. .
2014: Chicas muertas. Random House. Chronicle. .
2015: El desapego es una manera de querernos. Random House. Short stories (compilation). .
2017: El mono en el remolino: Notas del Rodaje de Zama de Lucrecia Martel. Random House. .
2021: No es un río. Random House. .

Works in translation
 2019: The Wind That Lays Waste. Graywolf Press. Novel. English trans. of El viento que arrasa by Chris Andrews. .
 2020: Dead Girls. Non-fiction.
 2021: Brickmakers. Novel.

Awards
 2010: Fondo Nacional de las Artes Fellowship
 2014: Finalist for the Tigre Juan Award for Ladrilleros

References

1973 births
21st-century Argentine novelists
21st-century Argentine poets
21st-century Argentine short story writers
21st-century Argentine women writers
21st-century Argentine writers
Argentine feminists
Argentine women novelists
Argentine women poets
Argentine women short story writers
Feminist writers
Living people
People from Entre Ríos Province